Safe Home is an Australian drama miniseries on SBS TV. It follows the story of a twenty-something professional, who leaves her job at a prominent law firm to work at a struggling family violence legal centre.

Cast
Cast were officially announced by both the series media release and the screenAus website
 Aisha Dee as Phoebe
 Mabel Li
 Virginia Gay
 Thomas Cocquerel
 Antonia Prebble
 Hal Cumpston
 Chenoa Deemal
 David Roberts
 Janet Andrewartha 
 Mark Mitchinson as Jon
 Tegan Stimson
 Katlyn Wong
 Nicholas Burton
 Yuchen Wang
 Jacquie Brennan as Nicole
 Ian Bliss as Detective O'Connor
 Queenie van de Zandt

Production 

The four-part miniseries was produced by Imogen Banks, directed by Stevie Cruz-Martin and created by playwright Anna Barnes, inspired by her time working at a family legal centre in Melbourne.

References

External links 
 

English-language television shows
Special Broadcasting Service original programming